Renclasea is a genus of clown beetles in the family Histeridae. There are about six described species in Renclasea.

Species
These six species belong to the genus Renclasea:
 Renclasea cazieri Tishechkin & Caterino, 2009
 Renclasea falli Tishechkin & Caterino, 2009
 Renclasea helavai Tishechkin & Caterino, 2009
 Renclasea mexicana Tishechkin & Caterino, 2009
 Renclasea occidentalis Tishechkin & Caterino, 2009
 Renclasea skelleyi Tishechkin & Caterino, 2009

References

Further reading

 
 
 

Histeridae
Articles created by Qbugbot